Fixed access:  In personal communications service (PCS), terminal access to a network in which there is a set relationship between a terminal and the access interface. A single "identifier" serves for both the access interface and the terminal. If the terminal moves to another access interface, that terminal assumes the identity of the new interface.

References

Network access